Walsura robusta is a tree species described by William Roxburgh; it is included in the family Meliaceae.  No subspecies are listed in the Catalogue of Life.  In Vietnamese its name is lòng tong.

References

 

robusta
Flora of Indo-China
Trees of Vietnam